Stjørdal or  is a municipality in Trøndelag county, Norway. It is part of the Stjørdalen region. The administrative centre of the municipality is the town of Stjørdal, also called Stjørdalshalsen. Some of the villages in the municipality include Elvran, Flornes, Hegra, Hell, Kvithammer, Prestmoen, Skatval, Skjelstadmarka, Sona, and Værnes.

The municipality is known for the village of Hell which is located in the Lånke area of Stjørdal. Hell is especially known for its train station, Hell Station, where you find the old sign saying  (meaning "Cargo handling").

The  municipality is the 125th largest by area out of the 356 municipalities in Norway. Stjørdal is the 50th most populous municipality in Norway with a population of 24,287.

General information

The old prestegjeld of Stjørdalen was established as the municipality of Stjørdalen on 1 January 1838 (see formannskapsdistrikt law). On 1 January 1850, Stjørdalen municipality was divided into two new municipalities: Øvre Stjørdal (population: 5,199) in the east and Nedre Stjørdal (population: 6,543) in the west. Later, on 1 January 1874, Øvre Stjørdal municipality was divided into two new municipalities: Hegra (population: 3,409) in the west and Meråker (population: 1,861) in the east. On 1 January 1902, Nedre Stjørdal municipality was divided into three new municipalities: Lånke (population: 1,449) in the south, Skatval (population: 2,125) in the north, and Stjørdal (population: 3,158) in the central part. This Stjørdal was quite small in comparison to its size today, but over time it was expanded.

During the 1960s, there were many municipal mergers across Norway due to the work of the Schei Committee. On 1 January 1962, the municipalities of Stjørdal (population: 6,204), Hegra (population: 2,704), Lånke (population: 1,967), and Skatval (population: 1,944) were all merged to form a much larger municipality of Stjørdal.

On 1 January 2018, the municipality switched from the old Nord-Trøndelag county to the new Trøndelag county.

Name
The municipality (originally the parish) is named after the Stjørdalen valley. The first element is the genitive case of the local river name  (now called the Stjørdalselva river). The meaning of the river name is unknown. Historically, the municipal name was spelled Stjørdalen.

Coat of arms and flag

On 29 September 1983, by resolution of its municipal council, Stjørdal adopted a new municipal coat of arms in red and gold, bearing a gold or yellow Lindworm (a two-legged dragon or wyvern) on a field of red. The arms were granted on 25 November 1983.

The official blazon is "Gules, a lindworm couchant Or". This means the arms have a red field (background) and the charge is a lindworm with two legs and two wings (also known as a wyvern. The charge has a tincture of Or which means it is commonly colored yellow, but if it is made out of metal, then gold is used. The arms were designed by Hallvard Trætteberg. Most Norwegian municipalities have a banner of their respective coats of arms as a flag, and accordingly, the municipal flag of Stjørdal similarly bears a yellow wyvern on a red field.

Although the coat of arms is from modern times, the dragon motif of the arms was inspired by a medieval seal for the district, dating from 1344. The old municipal seal was considered unsuitable for selection as the municipal coat of arms, because to obtain a municipal coat of arms and flag, a Norwegian municipality must fulfill certain heraldic requirements that do not apply to a seal. For example, a coat of arms will generally contain only one pictorial motif, while Stjørdal's seal had three motifs and failed to meet additional requirements concerning color elements. The municipality sought assistance from the National Archives of Norway, and was referred to archivist Hallvard Trætteberg, resulting in a collaboration to develop the new coat of arms.

The dragon is a symbol of Saint Margaret of Antioch, and its depiction is derived from Stjørdal's old seal, which showed Saint Margaret standing on a slain dragon. According to Stjørdal's municipal website, both the four-legged dragon and the two-legged wyvern are used in ancient designs of arms going back thousands of years, and have "always stood as a symbol of authority, power, and exalted dignity of great national cultures."

Churches

The Church of Norway has four parishes within the municipality of Stjørdal. It is part of the Stjørdal prosti (deanery) in the Diocese of Nidaros.

History

Stjørdal is the location of Steinvikholm Castle, the residence of Norway's last Catholic archbishop, Olav Engelbrektsson. It is located on the Skatval peninsula.

Hegra Fortress is located in the central part of the municipality. It was used as a defense against the Swedish military. It was also used during World War II in the Battle of Hegra Fortress.

The Stjørdal Folk Academy was founded in 1908 by Nils Anton Vaagland, who was later mayor of Stjørdal and also served as the academy's director for 10 years.

Government
All municipalities in Norway, including Stjørdal, are responsible for primary education (through 10th grade), outpatient health services, senior citizen services, unemployment and other social services, zoning, economic development, and municipal roads. The municipality is governed by a municipal council of elected representatives, which in turn elect a mayor. The municipality falls under the Trøndelag District Court and the Frostating Court of Appeal.

Municipal council
The municipal council of Stjørdal is made up of 41 representatives that are elected to four year terms. The party breakdown of the council is as follows:

Mayors
The mayors of Stjørdal:

1902–1907: Bernhard Øverland (V)
1908–1910: Peter Andreas Hofstad (V)
1911–1925: Nils M. Vaagland (V)
1926–1934: Marius Stokke (Bp)
1935–1937: Gustav Johnsen (V)
1938–1941: Peder Bjerve (V)
1941–1942: Agnar Nordback (NS)
1942–1944: Reidar Foss (NS)
1944–1945: Arnt Hegstad (NS)
1945-1945: Peder Bjerve (V)
1946–1951: Arne Holtesmo (Ap)
1952–1955: Johan A. Vikan (Bp)
1956–1959: Joar Eimhjellen (Ap)
1960–1966: Johan A. Vikan (Sp)
1966–1967: Lars Bidtnes (V)
1968–1975: Karl Eidsvik (Sp)
1976–1979: Kaare J. Forø (V/DNF)
1980–1985: Håvard Alstadheim (V)
1986–1993: Alf Daniel Moen (Ap)
1994–1995: Einar Wollebæk Andersen (H)
1995–1999: Alf Daniel Moen (Ap)
1999–2013: Johan Arnt Elverum (Sp)
2013–2022: Ivar Vigdenes (Sp)
2022–present: Eli Arnstad (Sp)

Geography

Stjørdal consists of the old municipalities of Skatval, Hegra, Lånke, and Stjørdal. The Stjørdalselva river runs through the Stjørdalen valley, with the Skatval peninsula on the northern side. The Forbordsfjellet mountain sits in the northern part of the municipality. The Skarvan and Roltdalen National Park lies in the eastern part of the municipality, as is a tiny part of the lake Feren.

The village of Stjørdal declared town status in 1997. Stjørdal is one of the fastest-growing municipalities in Trøndelag due to its proximity to the city of Trondheim and also to Statoil's presence (it controls a large part of the petroleum activity in the Norwegian Sea from Stjørdal).

Stjørdal is in the process of "growing together" with Trondheim, a show of regional urbanization. All four of these towns are located on the eastern shore of Trondheimsfjord.

Climate

Trondheim Airport Værnes in Stjørdal is used by Norway's met office as climate reference station for the Trøndelag region, and is sometimes used as reference station for the city of Trondheim. The weather station started operating in 1946. The location near the wide and deep Trondheimsfjord moderates winter temperatures.
The coldest month recorded at Værnes was February 1966 with mean  and average daily high . The warmest month was July 2014 with mean  and average high , while the weather station at nearby Kvithammar in Stjørdal recorded average high  in July 2014. On June 27, 2020, Værnes set a new record high with 34.3 °C. 
The record lows are all from before year 2000, the most recent is the January record low from 1996. Half of the monthly record highs are from 2000 or later.

There are on average 14 days during winter with at least  of snow cover on the ground based on the years 1971–2000. Temperatures have tended to be warmer in more recent decades with less snow cover in winter due to melting. The only recording of air frost in June was in 1975.

Birdlife
The Stjørdal area has a rich bird life with well over 260 recorded species and several good birding localities. Halsøen is virtually situated near the centre of Stjørdal, and can be easily viewed from a number of advantage points from route E6 in the east or Langøra in the west. Formed by the old river outlet, this tidal area is well worth checking. Due to the shallow waters and extensive areas of mud at low tide, Halsøen is used both as a wintering area and a migration stopover point by many species.

Culture
Kimen kulturhus is a culture house that opened in 2015, which includes a 3-auditorium cinema, a public library, and concert halls.

The radio station Radio Trøndelag is based in Stjørdal, which broadcasts programming targeted to rural Trøndelag audiences, and is the only significant radio station in the Trondheim metropolitan area that still broadcasts on FM.

Sports-wise, the southern farming-based district of Lånke is the place of the Lånkebanen, a rallycross complex that hosts annual rounds of the FIA World Rallycross Championship and the FIA European Rallycross Championship. The municipality's primary sports team is IL Stjørdals-Blink, whose men's football team currently plays in the 2. divisjon.

Transportation

Stjørdal is a regional transportation centre that is near the regional airport, Trondheim Airport, Værnes, as well as port facilities, European route E6, European route E14, and the Nordland Line going through the municipality from Trondheim to Bodø with stops at Hell Station, Trondheim Airport Station, Stjørdal Station, and Skatval Station. In addition, the Meråkerbanen railway line goes from Hell east to Åre Municipality in Sweden. Stations on that railway line include Hell Station, Hegra Station, Sona Station, and Flornes Station.

Regional bus services connect Stjørdal to Trondheim, Melhus, Orkanger, Steinkjer and Selbu 7 days a week, while two local routes connecting downtown Stjørdal with its northern and southern neighbourhoods run 6 and 5 days a week respectively.

Notable people

Public service & public thinking 

 Petter Johnsen Ertzgaard (1784 in Stjørdal – 1848) a farmer, elected official and military officer; rep. on Norwegian Constitutional Assembly
 Ole Vig (1824 in Kvithammer – 1857) a Norwegian teacher, poet, non-fiction writer, magazine editor and early proponent of universal public education
 Olaf Alfred Hoffstad (1865 in Stjørdal – 1943) botanist, writer, school principal and politician
 Andreas Fleischer (1878 in Hegra – 1957) a theologian, missionary to China, and Bishop of Diocese of Bjørgvin
 Johan Peter Trøite (1880 in Hegra – 1977) a politician, Mayor of Hegra 1937-1941
 Jon Leirfall (1899 in Hegra – 1998) a Norwegian politician, Mayor of Hegra 1959–1961
 Alf Amble (1909–1950) a petty criminal, anti-Semitic activist, writer and Nazi sympathiser in WWII, brought up in Stjørdal
 Petter Jakob Bjerve (1913 in Stjørdal – 2004) an economist, statistician, politician and director of Statistics Norway 1949–1980, president of the International Statistical Institute, 1971 to 1975
 Reidar Kvaal MC (1916 in Stjørdal – 2016) a Norwegian military officer, fought in Kompani Linge
 Håvard Alstadheim (1936 in Stjørdal – 1998) economist, politician, Mayor of Stjørdal 1980-1985
 Arnstein Øverkil (1937 in Hegra – 2014) a Norwegian police chief, freemason and civil servant
 Alf Daniel Moen (born 1950 in Hegra) forester, politician, Mayor of Stjørdal, 1986–94 & 1995–99
 Eli Arnstad (born 1962 in Stjørdal) a Norwegian civil servant, sports official and politician
 Marit Arnstad (born 1962 in Stjørdal) a Norwegian lawyer and politician

The Arts 
 Kjell Arnljot Wig (1924 in Stjørdal – 2015) a Norwegian media personality & TV host
 Mona Grudt (born 1971 in Stjørdal) a TV host, model, editor, and Miss Universe 1990
 Bjørn Marius Hegge (born 1987 in Elvran) jazz musician and composer, plays upright bass and guitar

Sport 
 Tor Richter (1938 in Stjørdal – 2010) a sports shooter, competed at the 1960 Summer Olympics
 Arild Holm (born 1942 in Stjørdal) an alpine skier, competed at the 1964 Winter Olympics
 Kjell Alseth (born 1960 in Stjørdal) a Norwegian football FIFA referee
 Fredrik Midtsjø (born 1993 in Stjørdal) a Norwegian footballer with 230 club caps

Twin towns – sister cities

Stjørdal is twinned with:
 Karstula, Finland

References

External links

Municipal fact sheet from Statistics Norway 
Angling in the Stjørdalselva (river)

 
Municipalities of Trøndelag
1902 establishments in Norway